Thomas Solstad (born 26 February 1997) is a Norwegian handball player for Bjerringbro-Silkeborg Håndbold and the Norwegian national team.

He represented Norway at the 2021 World Men's Handball Championship.

References

External links

1997 births
Living people
Norwegian male handball players
People from Ski, Norway
Sportspeople from Viken (county)